Mariangela Melato (19 September 1941 – 11 January 2013) was an Italian cinema and theater actress. She began her stage career in the 1960s. Her first film role was in Thomas e gli indemoniati (1969), directed by Pupi Avati. She played in many memorable films during the 1970s, a period which was considered her golden age, and she received much praise for her roles in films like The Seduction of Mimi (1972), Love and Anarchy (1973), Nada (1974), Swept Away (1974), Todo modo (1976), Caro Michele (1976) and Il gatto (1978). Melato also starred in several English-language productions as well, notably Flash Gordon (1980). She died from pancreatic cancer at the age of 71.

Biography and career

Early years
Born in Milan to a Triestine traffic policeman and a Milanese seamstress, Melato from a young age studied painting at the Academy of Brera, drawing posters and working as a window dresser at La Rinascente to pay for her acting lessons with Esperia Sperani. A striking, blonde actress, she began her stage career in 1960, entering the stage company of Fantasio Piccoli and debuting as an actress in the play Binario cieco.

From 1963 to 1965 she worked with Dario Fo in  Settimo: ruba un po' meno and La colpa è sempre del diavolo, then in 1967 she worked with Luchino Visconti in The Nun of Monza. In 1968, her final theater breakthrough with Orlando furioso by Luca Ronconi.

She made her film debut in 1969 with Pupi Avati's Thomas e gli indemoniati.

1970s

The seventies were the golden decade for Melato; she starred in memorable film roles including the school teacher in Nino Manfredi's commedia all'italiana Between Miracles (1971) and the female leads in Elio Petri's The Working Class Goes to Heaven (1971) and Vittorio De Sica's Lo chiameremo Andrea (We'll Call Him Andrew, 1972).

Then Melato received much praise for her role as Giancarlo Giannini's Milanese mistress in The Seduction of Mimi (1972), directed by Lina Wertmüller. This was to be the start of a very successful working relationship between Wertmüller, Melato and Giannini that continued with Love and Anarchy (1973), in which Melato played an anarchist prostitute, and finally with Swept Away by an Unusual Destiny in the Blue Sea of August (1974). Melato's critically acclaimed comedic performance in this film as a spoiled, unsympathetic aristocrat is one of her more internationally known roles.

For the remainder of the 1970s, Melato worked with some of Europe's most renowned directors, including Claude Chabrol in Nada (1974), Elio Petri in Todo modo (1976) and Luigi Comencini in Il gatto (1978). She also worked on television; playing the role of Princess Bithiah, in the miniseries Moses the Lawgiver (1974), also released in a theatrical version.

Later years
After attaining international success, Melato starred in several American productions, playing one of her most famous parts as the villainess General Kala in Flash Gordon (1980), and co-starring with Ryan O'Neal in the comedy So Fine (1981).

Unable to find real success in the United States and Hollywood, she returned to Italy, and appeared in a number of comedies and dramas. She also reunited with Lina Wertmüller for the filming of Summer Night (1986), but gradually she appeared in fewer films, and more on the stage, notably as the lead in The Miracle Worker.

Death
Melato died from pancreatic cancer on 11 January 2013 in Rome, Italy at age 71.

Selected filmography

 Let's Have a Riot   (1970)
 L'Invasion   (1970) - Valentina
 Thomas e gli indemoniati  (1970) - Zoe
 Io non scappo... fuggo (1970)
 The Swinging Confessors 	(1970) - Prostitute
 Basta guardarla (1971) - Marisa do Sol
 Between Miracles (1971) - Maestrina
 The Working Class Goes to Heaven	(1971) - Lidia
 Cometogether      (1971)
 Incontro 	(1971)
 La violenza: quinto potere	(1972) - Rosaria Licata
 The Seduction of Mimi	(1972) - Fiorella Meneghini
 Execution Squad	(1972) - Sandra
 Lo chiameremo Andrea	(1972) - Maria Antonazzi
 Il generale dorme in piedi	(1972) - Lola Pigna
 Love and Anarchy (1973) - Salomè
 Nada	(1974) - Veronique Cash
 Moses the Lawgiver	(1974) - La fille du maire
 Policewoman 	(1974) - Giovanna 'Gianna' Abbastanzi
 Swept Away	(1974) - Raffaella Pavone Lanzetti
 Faccia di spia	(1975) - Tania
 Di che segno sei?	(1975) - Marietta 'Claquette'
 The Guernica Tree	(1975) - Vandale
 Attenti al buffone	(1975) - Giulia
 Todo Modo	(1976) - Giacinta
 Caro Michele	(1976) - Mara Castorelli
 Beach House	(1977) - Giulia
 The Cat 	(1977) - Ofelia Pegoraro
 La presidentessa	(1977) - Yvette Jolifleur
 Saxofone (1978) - Fiorenza
 To Forget Venice (1979) - Anna
 I giorni cantati	(1979) - Angela
 Oggetti smarriti	(1979) - Marta
 Flash Gordon	(1980) - Kala
 In the Pope's Eye	(1980) - Unchosen actress
 Help Me Dream	(1981) - Francesca
 So Fine	(1981) - Lira
 Tomorrow We Dance	(1982) - Mariangela
 Il buon soldato	(1982) - Marta
 My Darling, My Dearest	(1982) - Armida
 Petomaniac	(1983) - Catherine Dumurier
 Secrets Secrets	(1985) - Giuliana, the judge
 My Dearest Son	(1986) - Stefania
 Summer Night	(1986) - Fulvia Bolk
 Dancers	(1987) - Contessa
 Mortacci 	(1988) - Jolanda
 The End Is Known	(1993) - Elena Malva
 Dirty Linen 	(1999) - Cinzia
 A Respectable Man  (1999) - Anna Tortora
 Probably Love (2001) - Mariangela Melato
 Love Returns (2004) - Federica
 Vieni via con me (2005) - Maria Grande

See also
 Anna Melato, actress and sister of Mariangela

References

External links
 
 
 Allmovie biography

1941 births
2013 deaths
Italian film actresses
Italian television actresses
Actresses from Milan
David di Donatello winners
Nastro d'Argento winners
Ciak d'oro winners
20th-century Italian actresses
21st-century Italian actresses
Deaths from pancreatic cancer
Deaths from cancer in Lazio
Brera Academy alumni